Hvalfjarðarstrandarhreppur was a municipality of Iceland.  As of December 1, 2004, its population was 147.

History
On 1 June 2006, it merged, along with the former municipalities of Innri-Akraneshreppi, Leirár- og Melahreppi and Skilmannahreppi, in the new one of Hvalfjarðarsveit.

External links
 Official site

Municipalities of Iceland